Hector Lopéz Alonso (born August 19, 1979, in Reinosa, Cantabria) is an S2 swimmer from Spain. He competed at the 2000 Summer Paralympics, winning a gold medal in the 50 meter backstroke race.

References

External links 
 
 

1979 births
Living people
Spanish male backstroke swimmers
Paralympic swimmers of Spain
Paralympic gold medalists for Spain
Paralympic medalists in swimming
Swimmers at the 2000 Summer Paralympics
Medalists at the 2000 Summer Paralympics
People from Cantabria
S2-classified Paralympic swimmers